Fracture zones are common features in the geology of oceanic basins. Globally most fault zones are located on divergent plate boundaries on oceanic crust. This means that they are located around mid-ocean ridges and trend perpendicular to them. The term fracture zone is used almost exclusively for features on oceanic crust; similar structures on continental crust are instead termed transform or strike slip faults, a denomination active fracture zones also can have. Some fracture zones have been created by mid-ocean ridge segments that have been subducted and may not longer exist.

Pacific Ocean

Most fracture zones in the Pacific Ocean originate from large mid-ocean ridges (also called "rises") such as the East Pacific Rise, Chile Rise and Juan de Fuca Ridge. The plates that host the fractures are Nazca, Pacific, Antarctic, Juan de Fuca and Cocos among others. Fracture zones being subducted under Southern and Central America are generally southwest-northeast oriented reflecting the relative motion of Cocos, Nazca and the Antarctic Plates.

Chile Rise
The fracture zones of the Chile Rise trend in a west to east fashion with the most southern ones taking a slightly more southwest to northeast orientation. This non-perpendicular relation to Chile's coast reflects the oblique subduction of Nazca Plate under southern Chile. West of Chile rise the fracture zones are hosted in the Antarctic Plate. Some fracture zones such as Chile and Valdivia make up large sections of the Nazca-Antarctic Plate boundary.

East Pacific Rise

Galapagos Rise
 Panama

Juan de Fuca and Gorda Ridges
Molokai and Murray fracture zones shown in the list were created by ridge segments that no longer exist.

 Blanco
 Mendocino
 Molokai
 Murray
 Sovanco

Atlantic Ocean
In the Atlantic Ocean most fracture zones originate from the Mid-Atlantic Ridge, which runs from north to south, and are therefore west to east oriented in general. There are about 300 fracture zones, with an average north-south separation of : two for each degree of latitude. Physically it makes sense to group Atlantic fracture zones into three categories:
 Small offset: length of transform fault less than 
 Medium offset: offset over 30 kilometers
 Large offset: offset several hundreds of kilometers

Mid-Atlantic Ridge (Northern Hemisphere)

Fracture zones involved in the early opening of the North Atlantic

Mid-Atlantic Ridge (Southern Hemisphere)

Indian Ocean
 Diamantina

Southwest Indian Ridge
 Bouvet Fracture Zone
 Moshesh Fracture Zone
 Islas Orcadas Fracture Zone
 Shaka Fracture Zone
 Dutoit Fracture Zone
 Prince Edward Fracture Zone
 Discovery II Fracture Zone
 Indomed Fracture Zone
 Gallieni Fracture Zone
 Atlantis II Fracture Zone
 Novara Fracture Zone
 Melville Fracture Zone

Carlsberg Ridge
 Owen

Central Indian Ridge
 Mauritius

Lakshadweep-Chagos Ridge
 Vishnu

Southern Ocean
 Endurance Fault Zone
 Eltanin Fault System
 Hjort Fracture Zone
 Hero Fault Zone
 Kosminskaya Fracture Zone
 Quest Fault Zone
 Pitman Fracture Zone
 Shackleton Fracture Zone
 Vinogradov Fracture Zone

References

 Sources
 The Global Seafloor Fabric and Magnetic Lineation Data Base Project

Fracture zones